The Australian Sports Car Championship was the national title for sports car racing drivers sanctioned by the Confederation of Australian Motor Sport from 1969 to 1988. Each championship was contested over a series of races with the exception of the 1975 title, which was awarded on the results of a single race held at the Phillip Island circuit in Victoria. 

Championship races were open to purpose-built sports racing cars complying with CAMS Group A Sports Car regulations except for the years 1976 to 1981 in which they were restricted to Group D Production Sports Cars.

Local manufacturers Matich, Elfin, Kaditcha, and K&A Engineering (Veskanda C1), along with McLaren dominated the series when run under Group A rules, while Porsche drivers won all six Group D based championships.

The championship winners are listed below.

References

Australian Motor Racing Year, 1988/89
CAMS Manuals of Motor Sport, 1969 to 1988
www.camsmanual.com.au

 
1969 establishments in Australia
1988 disestablishments in Australia
Sports leagues established in 1969
Sports leagues disestablished in 1988